Cephalopodum is a genus of flowering plant in the family Apiaceae. It is native to the Afghanistan, Tadzhikistan and Uzbekistan.

Species
, Plants of the World Online accepted three species:
Cephalopodum afghanicum (Rech.f. & Riedl) Pimenov & Kljuykov
Cephalopodum badachshanicum Korovin
Cephalopodum hissaricum Pimenov

References 

Apioideae